The Biz was a weekly English language tabloid newspaper published in Fairfield, New South Wales Australia. The paper was first published in 1917 by Albert Henry Johnson. For forty years the publishing house was located in Cabramatta, New South Wales, before being moved to Smart Street, Fairfield.  It ceased publication in January 1980. The Biz was digitised in 2012.

History
During the 1930s and 1940s, the paper was printed with a Model 8 Linotype machine made by the Mergenthaler Linotype Company.  During the mid 20th century period when The Biz was printed by W. R. Bright and Sons, the paper was printed with a F4503E Elrod strip casting machine manufactured by the Ludlow Typograph Company.

Digitisation
The various versions of the paper have been digitised as part of the Australian Newspapers Digitisation Program project hosted by the National Library of Australia.

See also
List of newspapers in Australia
 List of newspapers in New South Wales

References

Further reading
Isaacs, Victor; Kirkpatrick, Rod, Two hundred years of Sydney newspapers: A short history, Rural Press Ltd

External links
Bibliography: Australian Newspaper History
 
Hard copy & microfilm in Fairfield City Library

Defunct newspapers published in Sydney